L'Isle-Bouzon is a commune in the Gers department in southwestern France.

Geography
The village lies above the right bank of the Auroue, which flows north through the western part of the commune. The river Arrats forms all of the commune's eastern border.

Population

See also
Communes of the Gers department

References

Communes of Gers